The Union Flag is the name of the flag of the United Kingdom.

Union flag may also refer to:

 Flag of the African Union
 Flag of Europe, also called the Flag of the European Union
 Flag of the Kalmar Union
 Flag of the Soviet Union
 Flag of the Union of South Africa
 Grand Union Flag, the first national flag of the United States
 Flag of the United States (also called "Union")
 Union flag, of the Union during the American Civil War
 Union mark of Norway and Sweden
The Union Flag, newspaper published in Tennessee